Marcel Charles Stanley  (22 October 1918 – 24 July 1990) was a New Zealand philatelist who was added to the Roll of Distinguished Philatelists in 1971. He was a Fellow of the Royal Philatelic Society of New Zealand.

In the 1990 Queen's Birthday Honours, Stanley was appointed an Officer of the Order of the British Empire, for services to philately.

References

1918 births
1990 deaths
New Zealand philatelists
Signatories to the Roll of Distinguished Philatelists
New Zealand Officers of the Order of the British Empire